Rare Genius: The Undiscovered Masters is a posthumously created album that remixes previously unreleased Ray Charles studio recordings and demos made in the 1970s, 1980s and 1990s together with some contemporary instrumental and backing vocal parts.

Track listing
"Love's Gonna Bite You Back" – 3:54
"It Hurts To Be In Love" (Dixson, Toombs) – 4:53
"Wheel of Fortune" (Benjamin, Weiss) – 4:00	
"I'm Gonna Keep On Singin'" – 5:30	
"There'll Be Some Changes Made" (Blackstone, Overstreet) – 4:04	
"Isn't It Wonderful" (Taylor, Webster) – 4:13
"I Don't Want No One But You" – 4:20	
"A Little Bitty Tear" (Cochran) – 3:35	
"She's Gone" – 3:10	
"Why Me Lord?" (featuring Johnny Cash) (Kristofferson) – 3:57

Personnel
Original recordings:
Ray Charles – vocals, piano / keyboards
The Raelettes – backing vocals
Johnny Cash – lead vocal on "Why Me Lord?"
others (horns, strings, etc.)
contemporary (2010) additions:
Keb' Mo' – guitar
George Doering – guitar
Bobby Sparks – organ
Larry Goldings – piano, organ
Gary Grant – trumpet
Alan Kaplan – trombone
Trey Henry – bass
Chuck Berghofer – bass
Gregg Field – drums
Ray Brinker – drums
Eric Benét – background vocal

References

Concord 32196 
Allmusic.com review, Rare Genius: The Undiscovered Masters

Concord Records remix albums
2010 remix albums
Ray Charles albums